Jan Dettwyler (born 19 October 1978), professionally known as Seven, is a Swiss R&B, soul, and pop singer and musician.

Discography

Studio albums
 Dedicated To... (2002)
 Sevensoul (2004)
 Lovejam (2005)
 Home (2007)
 Like a Rocket (2009)
 The Art Is King (2012)
 The Art Is Piano (2013)
 BackFunkLoveSoul (2015)
 4Colors (2017)
 Ich Bin Mir Sicher! (2022)

EPs
 Brandneu (2020)

Live albums
 Seven Live – 2004 (2004)
 Seven Live @Cargo Club London (2005)
 Like a Rocket Live (2010)
 7/7 Live Experience (2019)

Compilations
 Unplugged (2010)
 Focused (2011)
 Best of 2002–2016 (2016)

Singles

 "Please" (2002)
 "Anymore" (2002)
 "Synthetic Soul" (2004)
 "Make U Happy" (2004)
 "Sign" (2005)
 "Mother" (2005)
 "Golden Stairs" (2007)
 "Wake Up" (2007)
 "On & On" (2007)
 "Lisa" (2009)
 "Go Slow" (2009)
 "Attitude" (2018)
 "Aber Wohi?" (2019)

 "Seele" (2020)
 "Immer Noch" (2020)
 "Dafür Musst Du Was Tun" (2020)
 "Junge (feat. Moses Pelham)" (2020)
 "Immer nur um Mich (feat. Flo Mega)" (2020)
 "Raus (feat. Curse)" (2020)
 "City of Gold – Live aus Frankfurt (feat. Laith Al-Deen)" (2020)
 "Unser kleines Wunder" (2021)
 "Lasst Uns Anders Sein" (2021)
 "Zu Zweit (feat. Cassandra Steen)" (2021)
 "Danke Dafür (feat. Credibil)" (2021)
 "Asche Im Wind" (2022)

References

External links

 

1978 births
Living people
People from Bremgarten District
Rhythm and blues singers
Swiss soul singers
21st-century Swiss  male singers